Leading Aircraftman  Albert Matthew Osborne GC (19 October 1906 – 2 April 1942), known as Matt Osborne, of the Royal Air Force Volunteer Reserve was awarded a posthumous George Cross for his "unsurpassed courage and devotion to duty" during incessant German air attacks on Malta.

Among his many acts of valour he made safe torpedoes in burning aircraft, rescued a pilot from a burning plane and worked to rescue trapped airmen amid heavy enemy bombing.  He was killed on 2 April 1942 by an explosion while fire fighting in a similarly courageous manner.

He enlisted in the RAF in July 1940.

George Cross citation
His citation was published in the London Gazette on 10 July 1942:

Osborne is buried at the Capuccini Naval Cemetery in Kalkara, Malta.

References

1942 deaths
People from Grimsby
British recipients of the George Cross
Royal Air Force recipients of the George Cross
Royal Air Force airmen
Royal Air Force Volunteer Reserve personnel of World War II
Royal Air Force personnel killed in World War II
1906 births
Deaths by airstrike during World War II
Military personnel from Lincolnshire
Burials in Malta